Abdul Ghafoor (1918 – 10 July 2004) was an Indian freedom fighter and politician who served as the 13th Chief Minister of Bihar from 2 July 1973 to 11 April 1975; and served as cabinet minister in Rajeev Gandhi's government. He participated actively in freedom struggles and served jail terms.

Early life and education
He was born in a small village of Gopalganj district, Sareya Akhteryar, in a humble farm family. Having completed his initial education from the district, he moved to Patna and subsequently to Aligarh for higher education. He completed his MA and Law at Aligarh Muslim University.

Quit India Movement 
Ghafoor was a part of the famous Young Turks of Bihar Congress during the independence movement along with Bindeshwari Dubey, Bhagwat Jha Azad, Chandrashekhar Singh, Satyendra Narayan Sinha, Kedar Pandey all future chief ministers and Sitaram Kesri, future national president of Indian National Congress.

Political career 

Abdul Ghafoor was Chief Minister of Bihar from 2 July 1973 to 11 April 1975. He was also Minister for Urban Development in Rajiv Gandhi Cabinet in 1984. He was elected to Lok Sabha twice in years 1984 and 1996 on Congress and Samata Party (Uday Mandal is current President) tickets from Siwan and Gopalganj Parliamentary constituencies respectively. He was also a former Chairman of the Bihar Legislative Council. He became member of state legislature for first time in the year 1952.

He died in Patna on 10 July 2004. His political legacy is being carried forward by Asif Ghafoor, his grandson. Asif Ghafoor is member of AICC and General Secretary of Bihar Pradesh Congress Committee, contested the 2010 Bihar Assembly election from Barauli constituency in Gopalganj district of Bihar as Indian National Congress nominee.

See also
List of Chief Ministers of Bihar
Abdul Ghafoor

References

1918 births
2004 deaths
Bihar MLAs 1972–1977
20th-century Indian Muslims
Chief Ministers of Bihar
Politicians from Patna
People from Gopalganj district, India
Lok Sabha members from Bihar
India MPs 1984–1989
India MPs 1991–1996
India MPs 1998–1999
Chief ministers from Indian National Congress
Indian National Congress politicians from Bihar
Samata Party politicians
People from Siwan district
Janata Dal politicians